Édouard Jean-Baptiste, comte Milhaud (10 July 1766 – 10 December 1833)  was a French politician and Général de Division. He is considered one of the best generals of cavalry of Napoleon's army.

French Revolutionary wars

Born in Arpajon-sur-Cère (Cantal) as the son of Louis Amilhaud and Marguerite Daudé, Milhaud was commissioned as an officer in 1789. He defended Jean-Paul Marat against the attacks of the Girondins. In 1793 he was sent as a commissary to the armies of the Rhine and the Ardennes where he distinguished himself in his severity and his zeal in applying revolutionary ideological principles. Sent to the army of the Pyrenees, he was successful in aiding Dugommier in restoring order. He was recalled the next year and made a member of the military committee.

After the fall of Robespierre, Milhaud was threatened with arrest but saved from this fate by his colleagues on the military committee. His political role effectively over, he was recalled to the army and he became commandant of the 5th dragoons and was sent to the Army of Italy. Milhaud distinguished himself at Brenta and in the battle of Bassano. The following year he was again accused because of his role during the Terror but the Council of Elders decided not to act on the accusation.

Milhaud took an active part in the conspiracy leading up to 18 brumaire which was the day of the coup d'état by which General Napoleon Bonaparte overthrew the French Directory. Promoted to general de brigade in January 1800 he was employed in the army of England and was made commander of the 8th military division in the Vaucluse.

Napoleonic Wars
During the War of the Third Coalition Milhaud served under Joachim Murat in the 1805 campaign leading up to the Battle of Austerlitz, in which he also took part. On the outbreak of the War of the Fourth Coalition in 1806, Milhaud distinguished himself at the Battle of Jena against the Prussian army. On 28 October 1806, he forced 6,000 Prussian troops of the corps of Prince Hohenlohe to capitulate. At the end of 1806 he was promoted to general of division and in 1807 he distinguished himself at the Battle of Eylau against the Russians.

His performance brought him to the attention of Napoleon Bonaparte, and having already been awarded the Légion d'honneur, on 10 March he was made a Count of the Empire. From 1808 until 1811, he fought in the Peninsular War. 

In November 1809, near Dos Barrios, one of his brigades of Dragoons was forced to retreat after a skirmish with Spanish horse under General Freire. That month, there was nothing directly between Aréizaga's vanguard at La Guardia, in Toledo, and Madrid, except for the Polish division of the IV Corps at Aranjuez, and Milhaud's five regiments of Dragoons at Ocaña. And on 18 November, the cavalry of Milhaud and Paris, made up of eight regiments, numbering almost 3,000 men, riding at the head of the French army, crossed the Tagus river at Aranjuez and met Freire's four divisions of horsemen, over 4,000 sabres, moving at the head of Areizaga's column. According to Oman (1908), "the collision of Milhaud and Freire brought about the largest cavalry fight which took place during the whole Peninsular War".

In July 1811, as part of Marshal Soult's Army of the South, Milhaud served at the head of 1,595 Dragoons in General Sebastiani's IV Corps.

In November 1811 he was put on disability but in June 1812 he was recalled to active service and made commandant of the 25th military division. During the invasion of Russia, he became for a short time the military commandant of Moscow.

In 1813 he commanded a cavalry corps at the Battle of Leipzig. He fought, October 10, 1813, in the plain of Zeitz, one of the best fights of cavalry mentioned in French military annals, and in which he completely destroyed regiments of Austrian Latour and Hohenzollern Dragoons, as well as the Kaiser Chevau-légers. Based on his experience with these commands in 1814 Milhaud became Inspector General of the cavalry. During the first Restoration he was given command of the 15th military division by Louis XVIII.

During Napoleon's Hundred Days, he immediately supported Napoleon, and in the Waterloo campaign he commanded the IV Cavalry Corps. At the Battle of Ligny on 16 June 1815 with his cuirassier divisions he broke the centre of the Prussian army and helped to win Napoleon's last victory. Two days later at the Battle of Waterloo 18 June his divisions took part in the great general cavalry assault on the allied centre, a plan he had opposed but had to execute. The attacks ultimately proved a failure.

After the second restoration Milhaud was banished by King Louis XVIII as a regicide. After the July Revolution in 1830, he was called back to France, but died on 10 December 1833 in Aurillac.

References

Bibliography
 Niemann, August (Hrsg.): Militär-Handlexikon. Adolf Bonz & Comp., Stuttgart, 1881.

Further reading
 Senior, Terry J. (2002). The Top Twenty French Cavalry Commanders: #20 "General Edouard-Jean-Baptiste Milhaud". napoleon-series.org. 
 David, Jacques Louis. "Portrait of Jean-Baptiste Milhaud (1766-1833), Deputy of the Convention". myartprints.co.uk

1766 births
1833 deaths
People from Cantal
Counts of the First French Empire
Commandeurs of the Légion d'honneur
Regicides of Louis XVI
French military personnel of the French Revolutionary Wars
French commanders of the Napoleonic Wars
Names inscribed under the Arc de Triomphe
Représentants en mission